Rose Hill is a historic home located at Front Royal, Warren County, Virginia. The original section was built in 1830, and is a two-story, a central-passage, single-pile plan frame dwelling with vernacular design elements derived from the Federal style. A two-story, brick rear ell with vernacular Greek Revival design elements was added in 1845. The front facade features a one-story, one-bay, hip roofed, Greek-Revival-style porch with paired Doric order wooden columns. Also on the property are the contributing two-story frame cottage, probably built originally as a kitchen/slave quarters, and two frame sheds clad in novelty siding (c. 1937).

It was listed on the National Register of Historic Places in 1996.

References

Houses on the National Register of Historic Places in Virginia
Greek Revival houses in Virginia
Federal architecture in Virginia
Houses completed in 1830
Houses in Warren County, Virginia
National Register of Historic Places in Warren County, Virginia
Front Royal, Virginia
1830 establishments in Virginia
Slave cabins and quarters in the United States